Akash Choan, is an Indian Bengali romcom film based on Procheto Gupta's short story Nadi and is directed by the duo of Abhijit Guha and Sudeshna Roy. The story revolves around Niladri, his wife Suchismita, their son Rayan, their neighbour Kaushik and Suchismita's sister Nibedita. The film was one of the Zee Bangla films released on television.

Plot
Niladri and Suchismita live in Kolkata with their son Rayan. Kaushik is a good natured young man who lives in the locality and is a regular visitor to their house. Suchismita takes advantage of his good nature by regularly using him to run errands while ridiculing him for his simplicity. The story begins with Kaushik going to receive Nibedita who is coming in from Bangalore. She is planning to go to USA for higher studies in Biotechnology.

The story continues with the growing love-hate relationship between Kaushik and the family arising from Kaushik's down market  attitude, penchant of forgetting names and faltering attempts to speak English, although his love and knowledge of Kolkata and its heritage brings him closer to Nibetita. They become even more attached when Kaushik organises a trip to 'Dugdugi'. On returning from the weekend trip Kaushik reveals he is also a Biotechnology student and has been trying to go to the USA  but is hindered by the TOEFL and GRE tests which he couldn't clear due to his poor English. Mingling with Niladri and the family has helped him improve his English, pass his tests and get selected for Washington University.

Cast
 Ridhima Ghosh as Nibedita
 Arjun Chakrabarty as Kaushik
 Kushal Chakraborty as Niladri
 Mohua Halder as Suchismita

References

External links

Films set in Kolkata
Films set in West Bengal
Bengali-language Indian films
2010s Bengali-language films